The Aeternae were a race of legendary creatures described in the travels of Alexander the Great. As Alexander's army passed northern Indian plains, they supposedly encountered the Aeternae, who killed some of Alexander's men. The Aeternae were described as killing and wounding enemies with "bony, saw-toothed protuberances sprouting from their heads."

See also
 List of Greek mythological creatures

References

Wars of Alexander the Great
Greek legendary creatures